Hugo Cuenca (born 2 March 1959) is a Venezuelan former swimmer. He competed in the men's 200 metre butterfly at the 1976 Summer Olympics.

References

1959 births
Living people
Venezuelan male swimmers
Olympic swimmers of Venezuela
Swimmers at the 1976 Summer Olympics
Place of birth missing (living people)
Male butterfly swimmers
20th-century Venezuelan people